Dr. A. P. J. Abdul Kalam Science City is a science city that is currently under construction. It is being built by Department of Science and Technology Government of Bihar to promote and popularize Science among people. It is located at Rajendra Nagar, Patna in the  Indian state of Bihar. It aims to promote and popularize science as well as demonstrating and preserving the history of scientific development in Bihar.

Design 
The building adopts state of the art technology. It is designed as a  G+1 building, covering  on a  site near the Moin-ul-Haq Stadium in Rajendra Nagar, Patna with an estimated cost . The construction works of Dr A P J Abdul Kalam Science City is likely to be completed by November 2022, whereas other technical works like installation of science exhibits are expected to be completed by June, 2023.

Exhibition
It is to have four galleries: Body and Mind, Space and Astronomy, Basic science, Sustainable planet consisting of 243 interactive and realistic exhibits.
Along with the same there will be a Grand Atrium lobby for entrance, Orientation Theatre, Multipurpose Halls, Temporary Exhibition Halls, 500 seater Auditorium, 300 seater Cafeteria, 4D Theatre, Retails spaces, Bio Diversity Park and many more to enchant the commuters to its beauty.

Facilities
It is to have four learning suites: Marker Space, Big Data Centre, Demo Kitchen and a gym on first floor for children who visit during a study tour or excursion. The dormitory is to accommodate 250 students connected to the learning suites.

Stakeholders Involved
Prime Stake holder is Department of Science & Technology, Govt. of Bihar Partnered with Building Construction Department, Govt. of Bihar for Excitation of Building works. Prime Consultant for the project is Flying Elephant Studio, Bangalore formed consortium along with Gleeds Consulting India Pvt Ltd (Project and Cost management consultant) and Studio Nabila birjis (Interior Consultant) (now known as Atelier birjis) and Gallagher & Associates (Exhibit Consultant) . Execution Agency is Shapoorji Pallonji.

See also
 Science City Kolkata
 Indira Gandhi Planetarium
 Gujarat Science City, Ahmedabad, Gujarat, India 
 Shrikrishna Science Centre

Reference

Tourist attractions in Patna
Buildings and structures in Patna
Bihar articles missing geocoordinate data
Science centres in India
Memorials to A. P. J. Abdul Kalam
Science parks in India
Science museums in India